The International Wrestling Association of Japan, more commonly known as IWA Japan, was a Japanese professional wrestling promotion operating from 1994 to 2004 and again from 2010 to 2014. It was formed by Víctor Quiñones as a successor to the W*ING promotion, which was folding at the time as a rival to Frontier Martial-Arts Wrestling (FMW), the pioneer of deathmatch wrestling in Japan and the only deathmatch promotion in Japan at the time. Most of the wrestlers jumped ship to Quiñones' new IWA Japan group. He found a sponsor in Tatsukuni "Kinroku" Asano, a business man who owned several restaurants in Tokyo and had bought and run several wrestling shows prior to IWA Japan.

Opening stage
They had their first show in Yokosuka, Kanagawa on May 21, 1994 which was taped for television. The early shows often featured many ex-W*ING wrestlers like Yukihiro Kanemura, Shoji Nakamaki, Nobutaka Araya and The Headhunters. They also had fans to fill out questionnaires about the shows and sometimes gave away freebies. Quiñones booked talent from all over the world to compete in IWA, including Cactus Jack and Terry Funk who engaged in some of their most famous bouts.

Kawasaki Dream

With IWA getting more popular due to the charisma of some of their wrestlers, they decided to produce a show called Kawasaki Dream, which was held on August 20, 1995 at the Kawasaki Baseball Stadium. The main attraction of the show was the first ever 8-man single elimination deathmatch tournament, which featured Cactus Jack, Terry Funk, Shoji Nakamaki, Hiroshi Ono, Leatherface, Tiger Jeet Singh, Terry Gordy and former FMW wrestler Mr. Gannosuke. The show also featured an NWA World Heavyweight Championship defense, as Tarzan Goto challenged then-champion Dan Severn for the title.

Demise
Quiñones left IWA at the end of 1995, along with the NWA affiliation. Goto, Gannosuke, and Flying Kid Ichihara followed suit in late-1996 to join Tokyo Pro. Subsequently, IWA started to go downhill after losing much of the talent that Quiñones booked.

The promotion folded on October 13, 2014, following its 20th anniversary event and the retirement of Asano.

Championships
IWA Triple Crown Championship
IWA World Heavyweight Championship
IWA World Tag Team Championship
IWA World Junior Heavyweight Championship
AJPW/IWA Women's World Championship
AWF World Women's Championship
W*ING World Heavyweight Championship

Roster
Natives: Great Kabuki, Tarzan Goto, Mr. Gannosuke, Yoshihiro Tajiri, Shoji Nakamaki, Nobutaka Araya, Daisuke Taue, Takashi Okano, Yoshiya Yamashita, Ryo Miyake, Flying Kid Ichihara, Mr. Pogo, Kintaro Kanemura, Hiroshi Ono, Kendo Nagasaki, Keisuke Yamada,  Kenji Takana, Mitsunobu Kikuzawa, Takashi Ishikawa, Shigeo Okumura, Kishin Kawabata.
Foreigners: Dick Slater, Terry Funk, Cactus Jack, Tracey Smothers, "Dr. Death" Steve Williams, "Hacksaw" Jim Duggan, The Headhunters (Headhunter A and Headhunter B) Headhunter III/ Big Buddah Miguel Perez Jr., Super Leather, Leatherface (Rick Patterson), The Iceman, Big Boss Man, The Crypt Keeper, Jason the Terrible (Rafel Moreno Jr.), Dennis Knight, New Jason the Terrible, Tiger Jeet Singh, Gran Sheik, Terry Gordy, Dan Severn, El Texano, Silver King

See also

Professional wrestling in Japan
List of professional wrestling promotions in Japan
List of National Wrestling Alliance territories
International Wrestling Association
IWA Mid-South

References

External links
IWA Japan (Archived)
@ProWresIWA
IWA Japan Title Histories

 
Japanese professional wrestling promotions
1994 establishments in Japan